Ryan Hansen is an American actor, entrepreneur and comedian. He is best known for starring as Dick Casablancas on the noir drama series Veronica Mars (2004–2019), as Kyle Bradway on the Starz comedy series Party Down (2009–2010, 2023-Present), and as Nolan in the horror remake film Friday the 13th (2009). Hansen also had a recurring role on the comedy series 2 Broke Girls (2012–2017) and the web series Burning Love (2012–2013).

Early life
Hansen was born in Fountain Valley, California and raised in El Cajon, California.

Career
Hansen began acting with guest-starring roles on series such as Grounded for Life, That's So Raven, and Las Vegas. In 2004, Hansen auditioned for the role of Duncan Kane on Veronica Mars but lost out to Teddy Dunn. However, Rob Thomas told him to try out for the role of Dick Casablancas.

In 2008, Hansen appeared in Superhero Movie, released on March 28. In 2008, Hansen appeared in the CCT original musical Alice as Trevor McKnight/White Night. The show opened on July 31 and ran through August 10, in San Diego. 

In 2011, Hansen portrayed Ben Lewis on the NBC sitcom Friends with Benefits.

BuddyTV ranked him #79 on its list of "TV's Sexiest Men of 2011".

In 2012, he began a recurring role as Andy, the candy shop owner, on the CBS sitcom 2 Broke Girls. The same year he had a supporting role in the film Hit and Run alongside Dax Shepard, Kristen Bell and Bradley Cooper. 

On October 25, 2017, the new YouTube Premium series Ryan Hansen Solves Crimes on Television premiered, in which Hansen plays a fictionalized version of himself, as the show's title character.

In 2020, he starred opposite Jimmy O. Yang in two films, Like a Boss and Fantasy Island, released a month apart. In the former film, their characters were business partners, and in the latter, they were step-siblings who were strongly fond of each other.

Personal life
Hansen married Amy Russell in 2004. The couple were Kristen Bell's housemates for two years. Hansen and Russell have three daughters.

Hansen has supported Invisible Children, which was founded by his brother-in-law Jason Russell. In 2010, he appeared in the online series The LXD: The Legion of Extraordinary Dancers, with 50% of the profits going to the Invisible Children campaign.

Filmography

Stage
 Alice (2008) – Trevor McKnight/White Night

References

External links
 
 
 Ryan Hansen interview with Mars Investigations

21st-century American male actors
American male film actors
American male stage actors
American male television actors
Living people
Male actors from Orange County, California
Male actors from San Diego
People from Fountain Valley, California
 Comedians from California
Year of birth missing (living people)